Cascine is an independent record label based in New York City

Cascine may also refer to:

 Cascine (Louisburg, North Carolina), a historic plantation complex in North Carolina, United States
 Cascine di Buti, a village in Buti, Italy

See also 

 Cascina (disambiguation)